General Sir George Macaulay Kirkpatrick  (23 August 1866 – 6 February 1950) was a Canadian soldier who served with the British Army in South Africa, Canada, India, Australia, and China.  He became one of only a handful of Canadians to reach the rank of full General.

Education

Kirkpatrick was born on 23 August 1866 to the politician Sir George Airey Kirkpatrick (1841–1899) and Frances June Macaulay of Kingston, Ontario. He was educated at Trinity College School in Port Hope, Ontario and at the Haileybury and Imperial Service College in London. He returned to Ontario to attend the Royal Military College of Canada in Kingston from 1882 to 1885. As a surveyor in 1892, he authored topographic maps of the Town and environs of the Fez Region of Morocco.

Military service
Kirkpatrick was commissioned into the Royal Engineers as a lieutenant on 30 June 1885. He was appointed Aide-de-camp to the General Officer Commanding, Thames District in 1892, and promoted to captain on 12 December 1894. He was deployed as Deputy Assistant Adjutant General (Intelligence) during the Second Boer War, and received the brevet rank of major on 29 November 1900. Following the end of the war in June 1902, he left Cape Town on the SS Canada and returned to Southampton in late July. He served in Halifax, Nova Scotia as Deputy Assistant Quartermaster General for Intelligence from September 1902, and received the brevet rank of lieutenant-colonel on 22 August 1902. Two years later he became Deputy Assistant Quartermaster General at Headquarters of the Army in 1904. He went on to be Assistant Quartermaster General at Headquarters, India in 1906 and Inspector General of the Military Forces of Australia in 1910. He served in World War I as Director of Military Operations in India from 1914 to 1916 when he became Chief of the General Staff in India.

He subsequently served as Commander of British Forces in China from 1921 to 1922 and General Officer Commanding-in-Chief, Western Command, India from 1923 to 1927. He retired in 1930.

Honours
Kirkpatrick was twice mentioned in despatches in 1902. He was appointed a Companion of the   Order of the Bath (CB) in 1911. He was knighted as a Knight Commander of the Order of the Star of India (KCSI) in 1917 and a Knight Commander of the Order of the Bath (KCB) in 1918.

Family

In 1896, Kirkpatrick married artist Mary Lydia Dennistoun (1870-1945). They had three daughters, Georgina Helen (born 1898) and Kathleen Mary (born 1899) in Malta, and Margaret Charlotte (born 1904) in Canada, mother of Iain Tennant.

References

Sources
4237 Dr. Adrian Preston & Peter Dennis (Edited) "Swords and Covenants" Rowman And Littlefield, London. Croom Helm. 1976.
H16511 Dr. Richard Arthur Preston "To Serve Canada: A History of the Royal Military College of Canada" 1997 Toronto, University of Toronto Press, 1969.
H16511 Dr. Richard Arthur Preston "Canada's RMC – A History of Royal Military College" Second Edition 1982
H1877 R. Guy C. Smith (editor) "As You Were! Ex-Cadets Remember". In 2 Volumes. Volume I: 1876–1918. Volume II: 1919–1984. Royal Military College. [Kingston]. The R.M.C. Club of Canada. 1984

External links 
Biography at the Dictionary of Canadian Biography Online

 

|-

|-
 

1866 births
1950 deaths
Canadian military personnel from Ontario
Canadian Anglicans
British Army generals
British Army generals of World War I
People educated at Haileybury and Imperial Service College
Royal West African Frontier Force officers
Knights Commander of the Order of the Bath
Knights Commander of the Order of the Star of India
Royal Military College of Canada alumni
Royal Engineers officers